Joseph-Nicolas Gautier dit Bellair (1689-1752) was one of the wealthiest Acadian as a merchant trader and a leader of the Acadian militia.  He participated in war efforts against the British during King George's War and Father Le Loutre’s War.  In the latter war, Gautier was particularly instrumental in the Acadian Exodus.

See also 
Military history of Nova Scotia
Military history of the Acadians

References 
 Thomas Garden Barns "Twelve Apostles" or a Dozen Traitors? Acadian Collaborators during King George’s War 1744-1748 in F. Murray Greenwood and Barry Wright eds. Law, Politics and Security Measures, 1608-1837.  Canadian State Trials. 1996. pp. 98–113
 John Faragher (2005). A Great and Noble Scheme
 Bernard Pothier. The Siege of Annapolis Royal, 1744. The Nova Scotia Historical Review. 59-71
 Bernard Pothier. Joseph-Nicolas Gautier. Canadian Dictionary of Biography. 
Earle Lockerby. Pre-Deportation Letters from Ile Saint Jean. Les Cahieers. La Societe hitorique acadienne. Vol. 42, No2. June 2011. pp. 56–105
Robert Sauvageau, Acadie: La guerre de cents ans des Francais d’Amerique aux Maritimes et en Louisiane, 1670-1769 (Paris: Berger-Levrault, 1987)

Footnotes

External links
 

1689 births
1752 deaths
Military history of Acadia
Military history of Nova Scotia
Military history of New England
Military history of the Thirteen Colonies
Acadian people
Acadian history
People of Father Le Loutre's War